Sic is a commune in Cluj County, Transylvania, Romania. It is composed of a single village, Sic.

Demography
At the 2011 census, 93.8% of inhabitants were Hungarians, 3.6% Romanians and 0.4% Roma. At the 2002 census, 75% were Hungarian Reformed, 10% Seventh Day Adventists, 6.6% Roman Catholics and 3.7% Romanian Orthodox.

Natives
György Aranka

References

Atlasul localităților județului Cluj (Cluj County Localities Atlas), Suncart Publishing House, Cluj-Napoca, 

Sic, Cluj
Localities in Transylvania
Mining communities in Romania